This is a list of flag bearers who have represented Suriname at the Olympics.

Flag bearers carry the national flag of their country at the opening ceremony of the Olympic Games.

See also
Suriname at the Olympics

References

Suriname at the Olympics
Suriname
Olympic flagbearers
Olympic flagbearers